Edrakpur High School (EHS) is a Government sponsored school in Birbhum district, West Bengal, India. It was founded in February 1951.

The school offers education for students ranging from eleventh grade to eighteenth grade (approximately ages 9 to 17). With over 1,600 students

History
Edrakpur High School was originally established at Edrakpur in 1951. This school opened on 2 February 1951.

Gallery

See also
Education in India
List of schools in India
Education in West Bengal

References

External links 

High schools and secondary schools in West Bengal
Schools in Birbhum district
Educational institutions established in 1951
1951 establishments in West Bengal